Charlotte Perkins Gilman (née Perkins; July 3, 1860 – August 17, 1935), also known by her first married name Charlotte Perkins Stetson, was an American humanist, novelist, writer, lecturer, advocate for social reform, and eugenicist. She was a utopian feminist and served as a role model for future generations of feminists because of her unorthodox concepts and lifestyle. She has been inducted into the National Women's Hall of Fame. Her best remembered work today is her semi-autobiographical short story "The Yellow Wallpaper", which she wrote after a severe bout of postpartum psychosis.

Early life
Gilman was born on July 3, 1860, in Hartford, Connecticut, to Mary Perkins (formerly Mary Fitch Westcott) and Frederic Beecher Perkins. She had only one brother, Thomas Adie, who was fourteen months older, because a physician advised Mary Perkins that she might die if she bore other children. During Charlotte's infancy, her father moved out and abandoned his wife and children, and the remainder of her childhood was spent in poverty.

Since their mother was unable to support the family on her own, the Perkinses were often in the presence of her father's aunts, namely Isabella Beecher Hooker, a suffragist; Harriet Beecher Stowe, author of Uncle Tom's Cabin; and Catharine Beecher, educationalist.

Her schooling was erratic: she attended seven different schools, for a cumulative total of just four years, ending when she was fifteen. Her mother was not affectionate with her children. To keep them from getting hurt as she had been, she forbade her children from making strong friendships or reading fiction. In her autobiography, The Living of Charlotte Perkins Gilman, Gilman wrote that her mother showed affection only when she thought her young daughter was asleep. Although she lived a childhood of isolated, impoverished loneliness, she unknowingly prepared herself for the life that lay ahead by frequently visiting the public library and studying ancient civilizations on her own. Additionally, her father's love for literature influenced her, and years later he contacted her with a list of books he felt would be worthwhile for her to read.

Much of Gilman's youth was spent in Providence, Rhode Island. What friends she had were mainly male, and she was unashamed, for her time, to call herself a "tomboy".

Her natural intelligence and breadth of knowledge always impressed her teachers, who were nonetheless disappointed in her because she was a poor student. Her favorite subject was "natural philosophy", especially what later would become known as physics. In 1878, the eighteen-year-old enrolled in classes at the Rhode Island School of Design with the monetary help of her absent father, and subsequently supported herself as an artist of trade cards. She was a tutor, and encouraged others to expand their artistic creativity. She was also a painter.

During her time at the Rhode Island School of Design, Gilman met Martha Luther in about 1879 and was believed to be in a romantic relationship with Luther. Gilman described the close relationship she had with Luther in her autobiography: 
 
Letters between the two women chronicles their lives from 1883 to 1889 and contains over 50 letters, including correspondence, illustrations and manuscripts. They pursued their relationship until Luther called it off in order to marry a man in 1881. Gilman was devastated and detested romance and love until she met her first husband.

Adulthood
In 1884, she married the artist Charles Walter Stetson, after initially declining his proposal because a gut feeling told her it was not the right thing for her. Their only child, Katharine Beecher Stetson (1885–1979), was born the following year on March 23, 1885. Charlotte Perkins Gilman suffered a very serious bout of post-partum depression. This was an age in which women were seen as "hysterical" and "nervous" beings; thus, when a woman claimed to be seriously ill after giving birth, her claims were sometimes dismissed.

Gilman moved to Southern California with her daughter Katherine and lived with friend Grace Ellery Channing. In 1888, Charlotte separated from her husband – a rare occurrence in the late nineteenth century. They officially divorced in 1894. After their divorce, Stetson married Channing. During the year she left her husband, Charlotte met Adeline Knapp, called "Delle". Cynthia J. Davis describes how the two women had a serious relationship. She writes that Gilman "believed that in Delle she had found a way to combine loving and living, and that with a woman as life mate she might more easily uphold that combination than she would in a conventional heterosexual marriage." The relationship ultimately came to an end. Following the separation from her husband, Charlotte moved with her daughter to Pasadena, California, where she became active in several feminist and reformist organizations such as the Pacific Coast Women's Press Association, the Woman's Alliance, the Economic Club, the Ebell Society (named after Adrian John Ebell), the Parents Association, and the State Council of Women, in addition to writing and editing the Bulletin, a journal put out by one of the earlier-mentioned organizations.

In 1894, Gilman sent her daughter east to live with her former husband and his second wife, her friend Grace Ellery Channing. Gilman reported in her memoir that she was happy for the couple, since Katharine's "second mother was fully as good as the first, [and perhaps] better in some ways." Gilman also held progressive views about paternal rights and acknowledged that her ex-husband "had a right to some of [Katharine's] society" and that Katharine "had a right to know and love her father."

After her mother died in 1893, Gilman decided to move back east for the first time in eight years. She contacted Houghton Gilman, her first cousin, whom she had not seen in roughly fifteen years, who was a Wall Street attorney. They began spending a significant amount of time together almost immediately and became romantically involved. While she would go on lecture tours, Houghton and Charlotte would exchange letters and spend as much time as they could together before she left. In her diaries, she describes him as being "pleasurable" and it is clear that she was deeply interested in him. From their wedding in 1900 until 1922, they lived in New York City. Their marriage was nothing like her first one. In 1922, Gilman moved from New York to Houghton's old homestead in Norwich, Connecticut. Following Houghton's sudden death from a cerebral hemorrhage in 1934, Gilman moved back to Pasadena, California, where her daughter lived.

In January 1932, Gilman was diagnosed with incurable breast cancer. An advocate of euthanasia for the terminally ill, Gilman died by suicide on August 17, 1935, by taking an overdose of chloroform. In both her autobiography and suicide note, she wrote that she "chose chloroform over cancer" and she died quickly and quietly.

Career
At one point, Gilman supported herself by selling soap door to door. After moving to Pasadena, Gilman became active in organizing social reform movements. As a delegate, she represented California in 1896 at both the National American Woman Suffrage Association convention in Washington, D.C., and the International Socialist and Labor Congress in London. In 1890, she was introduced to Nationalist Clubs movement which worked to "end capitalism's greed and distinctions between classes while promoting a peaceful, ethical, and truly progressive human race." Published in the Nationalist magazine, her poem "Similar Cases" was a satirical review of people who resisted social change, and she received positive feedback from critics for it. Throughout that same year, 1890, she became inspired enough to write fifteen essays, poems, a novella, and the short story The Yellow Wallpaper. Her career was launched when she began lecturing on Nationalism and gained the public's eye with her first volume of poetry, In This Our World, published in 1893. As a successful lecturer who relied on giving speeches as a source of income, her fame grew along with her social circle of similar-minded activists and writers of the feminist movement.

"The Yellow Wallpaper"

In 1890, Gilman wrote her short story "The Yellow Wallpaper", which is now the all-time best selling book of the Feminist Press. She wrote it on June 6 and 7, 1890, in her home of Pasadena, and it was printed a year and a half later in the January 1892 issue of The New England Magazine. Since its original printing, it has been anthologized in numerous collections of women's literature, American literature, and textbooks, though not always in its original form. For instance, many textbooks omit the phrase "in marriage" from a very important line in the beginning of story: "John laughs at me, of course, but one expects that in marriage." The reason for this omission is a mystery, as Gilman's views on marriage are made clear throughout the story.

The story is about a woman who suffers from mental illness after three months of being closeted in a room by her husband for the sake of her health. She becomes obsessed with the room's revolting yellow wallpaper. Gilman wrote this story to change people's minds about the role of women in society, illustrating how women's lack of autonomy is detrimental to their mental, emotional, and even physical wellbeing. This story was inspired by her treatment from her first husband. The narrator in the story must do as her husband (who is also her doctor) demands, although the treatment he prescribes contrasts directly with what she truly needs—mental stimulation and the freedom to escape the monotony of the room to which she is confined. "The Yellow Wallpaper" was essentially a response to the doctor (Dr. Silas Weir Mitchell) who had tried to cure her of her depression through a "rest cure". She sent him a copy of the story.

Other notable works

Gilman's first book was Art Gems for the Home and Fireside (1888); however, it was her first volume of poetry, In This Our World (1893), a collection of satirical poems, that first brought her recognition. During the next two decades she gained much of her fame with lectures on women's issues, ethics, labor, human rights, and social reform. Her lecture tours took her across the United States. She often referred to these themes in her fiction.

In 1894–95 Gilman served as editor of the magazine The Impress, a literary weekly that was published by the Pacific Coast Women's Press Association (formerly the Bulletin). For the twenty weeks the magazine was printed, she was consumed in the satisfying accomplishment of contributing its poems, editorials, and other articles. The short-lived paper's printing came to an end as a result of a social bias against her lifestyle which included being an unconventional mother and a woman who had divorced a man. After a four-month-long lecture tour that ended in April 1897, Gilman began to think more deeply about sexual relationships and economics in American life, eventually completing the first draft of Women and Economics (1898). This book discussed the role of women in the home, arguing for changes in the practices of child-raising and housekeeping to alleviate pressures from women and potentially allow them to expand their work to the public sphere. The book was published in the following year and propelled Gilman into the international spotlight. In 1903, she addressed the International Congress of Women in Berlin. The next year, she toured in England, the Netherlands, Germany, Austria, and Hungary.

In 1903 she wrote one of her most critically acclaimed books, The Home: Its Work and Influence, which expanded upon Women and Economics, proposing that women are oppressed in their home and that the environment in which they live needs to be modified in order to be healthy for their mental states. In between traveling and writing, her career as a literary figure was secured. From 1909 to 1916 Gilman single-handedly wrote and edited her own magazine, The Forerunner, in which much of her fiction appeared. By presenting material in her magazine that would "stimulate thought", "arouse hope, courage and impatience", and "express ideas which need a special medium", she aimed to go against the mainstream media which was overly sensational. Over seven years and two months the magazine produced eighty-six issues, each twenty eight pages long. The magazine had nearly 1,500 subscribers and featured such serialized works as "What Diantha Did" (1910), The Crux (1911), Moving the Mountain (1911), and Herland. The Forerunner has been cited as being "perhaps the greatest literary accomplishment of her long career". After its seven years, she wrote hundreds of articles that were submitted to the Louisville Herald, The Baltimore Sun, and the Buffalo Evening News. Her autobiography, The Living of Charlotte Perkins Gilman, which she began to write in 1925, appeared posthumously in 1935.

Rest cure treatment
Perkins-Gilman married Charles Stetson in 1884, and less than a year later gave birth to their daughter Katharine. Already susceptible to depression, her symptoms were exacerbated by marriage and motherhood. A good proportion of her diary entries from the time she gave birth to her daughter until several years later describe the oncoming depression that she was to face.

On April 18, 1887, Gilman wrote in her diary that she was very sick with "some brain disease" which brought suffering that cannot be felt by anybody else, to the point that her "mind has given way". To begin, the patient could not even leave her bed, read, write, sew, talk, or feed herself.

After nine weeks, Gilman was sent home with Mitchell's instructions, "Live as domestic a life as possible. Have your child with you all the time... Lie down an hour after each meal. Have but two hours' intellectual life a day. And never touch pen, brush or pencil as long as you live." She tried for a few months to follow Mitchell's advice, but her depression deepened, and Gilman came perilously close to a full emotional collapse. Her remaining sanity was on the line and she began to display suicidal behavior that involved talk of pistols and chloroform, as recorded in her husband's diaries. By early summer the couple had decided that a divorce was necessary for her to regain sanity without affecting the lives of her husband and daughter.

During the summer of 1888, Charlotte and Katharine spent time in Bristol, Rhode Island, away from Walter, and it was there where her depression began to lift. She writes of herself noticing positive changes in her attitude. She returned to Providence in September. She sold property that had been left to her in Connecticut, and went with a friend, Grace Channing, to Pasadena where the recovery of her depression can be seen through the transformation of her intellectual life.

Social views and theories

Reform Darwinism and the role of women in society 
Gilman called herself a humanist and believed the domestic environment oppressed women through the patriarchal beliefs upheld by society. Gilman embraced the theory of reform Darwinism and argued that Darwin's theories of evolution presented only the male as the given in the process of human evolution, thus overlooking the origins of the female brain in society that rationally chose the best suited mate that they could find.

Gilman argued that male aggressiveness and maternal roles for women were artificial and no longer necessary for survival in post-prehistoric times. She wrote, "There is no female mind. The brain is not an organ of sex. Might as well speak of a female liver."

Her main argument was that sex and domestic economics went hand in hand; for a woman to survive, she was reliant on her sexual assets to please her husband so that he would financially support his family. From childhood, young girls are forced into a social constraint that prepares them for motherhood by the toys that are marketed to them and the clothes designed for them. She argued that there should be no difference in the clothes that little girls and boys wear, the toys they play with, or the activities they do, and described tomboys as perfect humans who ran around and used their bodies freely and healthily.

Gilman argued that women's contributions to civilization, throughout history, have been halted because of an androcentric culture. She believed that womankind was the underdeveloped half of humanity, and improvement was necessary to prevent the deterioration of the human race. Gilman believed economic independence is the only thing that could really bring freedom for women and make them equal to men. In 1898 she published Women and Economics, a theoretical treatise which argued, among other things, that women are subjugated by men, that motherhood should not preclude a woman from working outside the home, and that housekeeping, cooking, and child care, would be professionalized. "The ideal woman," Gilman wrote, "was not only assigned a social role that locked her into her home, but she was also expected to like it, to be cheerful and gay, smiling and good-humored." When the sexual-economic relationship ceases to exist, life on the domestic front would certainly improve, as frustration in relationships often stems from the lack of social contact that the domestic wife has with the outside world.

Gilman became a spokesperson on topics such as women's perspectives on work, dress reform, and family. Housework, she argued, should be equally shared by men and women, and that at an early age women should be encouraged to be independent. In many of her major works, including "The Home" (1903), Human Work (1904), and The Man-Made World (1911), Gilman also advocated women working outside of the home.

Gilman argued that the home should be socially redefined. The home should shift from being an "economic entity" where a married couple live together because of the economic benefit or necessity, to a place where groups of men and groups of women can share in a "peaceful and permanent expression of personal life."

Gilman believed having a comfortable and healthy lifestyle should not be restricted to married couples; all humans need a home that provides these amenities. She suggested that a communal type of housing open to both males and females, consisting of rooms, rooms of suites and houses, should be constructed. This would allow individuals to live singly and still have companionship and the comforts of a home. Both males and females would be totally economically independent in these living arrangements allowing for marriage to occur without either the male or the female's economic status having to change.

The structural arrangement of the home is also redefined by Gilman. She removes the kitchen from the home, leaving rooms to be arranged and extended in any form and freeing women from the provision of meals in the home. The home would become a true personal expression of the individual living in it.

Ultimately the restructuring of the home and manner of living will allow individuals, especially women, to become an "integral part of the social structure, in close, direct, permanent connection with the needs and uses of society." That would be a dramatic change for women, who generally considered themselves restricted by family life built upon their economic dependence on men.

Feminism in stories and novellas

Gilman created a world in many of her stories with a feminist point of view. Two of her narratives, "What Diantha Did", and Herland, are good examples of Gilman focusing her work on how women are not just stay-at-home mothers they are expected to be; they are also people who have dreams, who are able to travel and work just as men do, and whose goals include a society where women are just as important as men. The world-building that is executed by Gilman, as well as the characters in these two stories and others, embody the change that was needed in the early 1900s in a way that is now commonly seen as feminism.

Gilman uses world-building in Herland to demonstrate the equality that she longed to see. The women of Herland are the providers. This makes them appear to be the dominant sex, taking over the gender roles that are typically given to men. Elizabeth Keyser notes, "In Herland the supposedly superior sex becomes the inferior or disadvantaged ..." In this society, Gilman makes it to where women are focused on having leadership within the community, fulfilling roles that are stereotypically seen as being male roles, and running an entire community without the same attitudes that men have concerning their work and the community. However, the attitude men carried concerning women were degrading, especially by progressive women, like Gilman. Using Herland, Gilman challenged this stereotype, and made the society of Herland a type of paradise. Gilman uses this story to confirm the stereotypically devalued qualities of women are valuable, show strength, and shatters traditional utopian structure for future works. Essentially, Gilman creates Herland's society to have women hold all the power, showing more equality in this world, alluding to changes she wanted to see in her lifetime.

Gilman's feministic approach differs from Herland in "What Diantha Did". One character in this story, Diantha, breaks through the traditional expectation of women, showing Gilman's desires for what a woman would be able to do in real-life society. Throughout the story, Gilman portrays Diantha as a character who strikes through the image of businesses in the U.S., who challenges gender norms and roles, and who believed that women could provide the solution to the corruption in big business in society. Gilman chooses to have Diantha choose a career that is stereotypically not one a woman would have because in doing so, she is showing that the salaries and wages of traditional women's jobs are unfair. Diantha's choice to run a business allows her to come out of the shadows and join society. Gilman's works, especially her work with "What Diantha Did", are a call for change, a battle cry that would cause panic in men and power in women. Gilman used her work as a platform for a call to change, as a way to reach women and have them begin the movement toward freedom.

Race
In 1908, Gilman wrote an article in the American Journal of Sociology in which she set out her views on what she perceived to be a "sociological problem" concerning the presence of a large Black American minority in America. Calling Black Americans "a large body of aliens" whose skin color made them "widely dissimilar and in many respects inferior," Gilman claimed that the economic and social situation of Black Americans was "to us a social injury" and noted that slavery meant that it was the responsibility of White Americans to alleviate this situation, observing that if White Americans "cannot so behave as to elevate and improve [Black Americans]", then it would be the case that White Americans would "need some scheme of race betterment" rather than vice versa. Gilman was unequivocal about the ills of slavery and the wrongs which many White Americans had done to Black Americans, stating that irrespective of any crimes committed by Black Americans, "[Whites] were the original offender, and have a list of injuries to [Black Americans], greatly outnumbering the counter list." She proposed that those Black Americans who were not "self-supporting" or who were "actual criminals" (which she clearly distinguished from "the decent, self-supporting, progressive negroes") could be "enlisted" into a quasi-military state labour force, which she viewed as akin to conscription in certain countries. Such force would be deployed in "modern agriculture" and infrastructure, and those who had eventually acquired adequate skills and training "would be graduated with honor" – Gilman believed that any such conscription should be "compulsory at the bottom, perfectly free at the top."

Gilman's racism lead her to espouse eugenicist beliefs, claiming that Old Stock Americans were surrendering their country to immigrants who were diluting the nation's racial purity. When asked about her stance on the matter during a trip to London she declared "I am an Anglo-Saxon before everything." In an effort to gain the vote for all women, she spoke out against literacy voting tests at the 1903 National American Woman Suffrage Association convention in New Orleans.

Literary critic Susan S. Lanser says "The Yellow Wallpaper" should be interpreted by focusing on Gilman's racism. Other literary critics have built on Lanser's work to understand Gilman's ideas in relation to turn-of-the-century culture more broadly.

Animals 
Gilman's feminist works often included stances and arguments for reforming the use of domesticated animals. In Herland, Gilman's utopian society excludes all domesticated animals, including livestock. Additionally, in Moving the Mountain Gilman addresses the ills of animal domestication related to inbreeding. In "When I Was a Witch", the narrator witnesses and intervenes in instances of animal use as she travels through New York, liberating work horses, cats, and lapdogs by rendering them "comfortably dead". One literary scholar connected the regression of the female narrator in "The Yellow Wallpaper" to the parallel status of domesticated felines. She wrote in a letter to the Saturday Evening Post that the automobile would eliminate the cruelty to horses used to pull carriages and cars.

Critical reception
"The Yellow Wallpaper" was initially met with a mixed reception. One anonymous letter submitted to the Boston Transcript read, "The story could hardly, it would seem, give pleasure to any reader, and to many whose lives have been touched through the dearest ties by this dread disease, it must bring the keenest pain. To others, whose lives have become a struggle against heredity of mental derangement, such literature contains deadly peril. Should such stories be allowed to pass without severest censure?"

Positive reviewers describe it as impressive because it is the most suggestive and graphic account of why women who live monotonous lives are susceptible to mental illness.

Although Gilman had gained international fame with the publication of Women and Economics in 1898, by the end of World War I, she seemed out of tune with her times. In her autobiography she admitted that "unfortunately my views on the sex question do not appeal to the Freudian complex of today, nor are people satisfied with a presentation of religion as a help in our tremendous work of improving this world."

Ann J. Lane writes in Herland and Beyond that "Gilman offered perspectives on major issues of gender with which we still grapple; the origins of women's subjugation, the struggle to achieve both autonomy and intimacy in human relationships; the central role of work as a definition of self; new strategies for rearing and educating future generations to create a humane and nurturing environment."

Bibliography

Gilman's works include:

Poetry collections
In This Our World,1st ed. Oakland: McCombs & Vaughn, 1893. London: T. Fisher Unwin, 1895. 2nd ed.; San Francisco: Press of James H. Barry, 1895.
Suffrage Songs and Verses. New York: Charlton Co., 1911. Microfilm. New Haven: Research Publications, 1977, History of Women #6558.
The Later Poetry of Charlotte Perkins Gilman. Newark, DE: University of Delaware Press, 1996.

Short stories
Gilman published 186 short stories in magazines, newspapers, and many were published in her self-published monthly, The Forerunner. Many literary critics have ignored these short stories.

"Circumstances Alter Cases." Kate Field's Washington, July 23, 1890: 55–56. "The Yellow Wall-Paper" and Other Stories. Ed. Robert Shulman. Oxford: Oxford University Press, 1995. 32–38.
"That Rare Jewel." Women's Journal, May 17, 1890: 158. "The Yellow Wall-Paper" and Other Stories. Ed. Robert Shulman. Oxford: Oxford UP, 1995. 20–24.
"The Unexpected." Kate Field's Washington, May 21, 1890: 335–6. "The Yellow Wall-Paper" and Other Stories. Ed. Robert Shulman. Oxford: Oxford UP, 1995. 25–31.
"An Extinct Angel." Kate Field's Washington, September 23, 1891:199–200. "The Yellow Wall-Paper" and Other Stories. Ed. Robert Shulman. Oxford: Oxford UP, 1995. 48–50.
"The Giant Wistaria." New England Magazine 4 (1891): 480–85. "The Yellow Wall-Paper" and Other Stories. Ed. Robert Shulman. Oxford: Oxford UP, 1995. 39–47.
"The Yellow Wall-paper." New England Magazine 5 (1892): 647–56; Boston: Small, Maynard & Co., 1899; NY: Feminist Press, 1973 Afterword Elaine Hedges; Oxford: Oxford UP, 1995. Introduction Robert Shulman.
"The Rocking-Chair." Worthington's Illustrated 1 (1893): 453–59. "The Yellow Wall-Paper" and Other Stories. Ed. Robert Shulman. Oxford: Oxford UP, 1995. 51–61.
"An Elopement." San Francisco Call, July 10, 1893: 1. "The Yellow Wall-Paper" and Other Stories. Ed. Robert Shulman. Oxford: Oxford UP, 1995. 66–68.
"Deserted." San Francisco Call July 17, 1893: 1–2. "The Yellow Wall-Paper" and Other Stories. Ed. Robert Shulman. Oxford: Oxford UP, 1995. 62–65.
"Through This." Kate Field's Washington, September 13, 1893: 166. "The Yellow Wall-Paper" and Other Stories. Ed. Robert Shulman. Oxford: Oxford UP, 1995. 69–72.
"A Day's Berryin.'" Impress, October 13, 1894: 4–5. "The Yellow Wall-Paper" and Other Stories. Ed. Robert Shulman. Oxford: Oxford UP, 1995. 78–82.
"Five Girls." Impress, December 1, 1894: 5. "The Yellow Wall-Paper" and Other Stories. Ed. Robert Shulman. Oxford: Oxford UP, 1995. 83–86.
"One Way Out." Impress, December 29, 1894: 4–5. "The Yellow Wall-Paper" and Other Stories. Ed. Robert Shulman. Oxford: Oxford UP, 1995. 87–91.
"The Misleading of Pendleton Oaks." Impress, October 6, 1894: 4–5. "The Yellow Wall-Paper" and Other Stories. Ed. Robert Shulman. Oxford: Oxford UP, 1995. 73–77.
"An Unnatural Mother." Impress, February 16, 1895: 4–5. "The Yellow Wall-Paper" and Other Stories. Ed. Robert Shulman. Oxford: Oxford UP, 1995. 98–106.
"An Unpatented Process." Impress, January 12, 1895: 4–5. "The Yellow Wall-Paper" and Other Stories. Ed. Robert Shulman. Oxford: Oxford UP, 1995. 92–97.
"According to Solomon." Forerunner 1:2 (1909):1–5. "The Yellow Wall-Paper" and Other Stories. Ed. Robert Shulman. Oxford: Oxford UP, 1995. 122–129.
"Three Thanksgivings." Forerunner 1 (1909): 5–12. "The Yellow Wall-Paper" and Other Stories. Ed. Robert Shulman. Oxford: Oxford UP, 1995. 107–121.
"What Diantha Did. A NOVEL". Forerunner 1 (1909–11); NY: Charlton Co., 1910; London: T. Fisher Unwin, 1912.
"The Cottagette." Forerunner 1:10 (1910): 1–5. "The Yellow Wall-Paper" and Other Stories. Ed. Robert Shulman. Oxford: Oxford UP, 1995. 130–138.
"When I Was a Witch." Forerunner 1 (1910): 1–6. The Charlotte Perkins Gilman Reader. Ed. Ann J. Lane. NY: Pantheon, 1980. 21–31.
"In Two Houses." Forerunner 2:7 (1911): 171–77. "The Yellow Wall-Paper" and Other Stories. Ed. Robert Shulman. Oxford: Oxford UP, 1995. 159–171.
"Making a Change." Forerunner 2:12 (1911): 311–315. "The Yellow Wall-Paper" and Other Stories. Ed. Robert Shulman. Oxford: Oxford UP, 1995. 182–190.
"Moving the Mountain." Forerunner 2 (1911); NY: Charlton Co., 1911; The Charlotte Perkins Gilman Reader. Ed. Ann J. Lane. NY: Pantheon, 1980. 178–188.
"The Crux.A NOVEL." Forerunner 2 (1910); NY: Charlton Co., 1911; The Charlotte Perkins Gilman Reader. Ed. Ann J. Lane. NY: Pantheon, 1980. 116–122.
"The Jumping-off Place." Forerunner 2:4 (1911): 87–93. "The Yellow Wall-Paper" and Other Stories. Ed. Robert Shulman. Oxford: Oxford UP, 1995. 148–158.
"The Widow's Might." Forerunner 2:1 (1911): 3–7. "The Yellow Wall-Paper" and Other Stories. Ed. Robert Shulman. Oxford: Oxford UP, 1995. 139–147.
"Turned." Forerunner 2:9 (1911): 227–32. "The Yellow Wall-Paper" and Other Stories. Ed. Robert Shulman. Oxford: Oxford UP, 1995. 182–191.
"Mrs. Elder's Idea." Forerunner 3:2 (1912): 29–32. "The Yellow Wall-Paper" and Other Stories. Ed. Robert Shulman. Oxford: Oxford UP, 1995. 191–199.
"Their House." Forerunner 3:12 (1912): 309–14. "The Yellow Wall-Paper" and Other Stories''''. Ed. Robert Shulman. Oxford: Oxford UP, 1995. 200–209.
"A Council of War." Forerunner 4:8 (1913): 197–201. "The Yellow Wall-Paper" and Other Stories. Ed. Robert Shulman. Oxford: Oxford UP, 1995. 235–243.
"Bee Wise." Forerunner 4:7 (1913): 169–173. "The Yellow Wall-Paper" and Other Stories. Ed. Robert Shulman. Oxford: Oxford UP, 1995. 226–234.
"Her Beauty." Forerunner 4:2 (1913): 29–33. "The Yellow Wall-Paper" and Other Stories. Ed. Robert Shulman. Oxford: Oxford UP, 1995. 210–217.
"Mrs. Hines's Money." Forerunner 4:4 (1913): 85–89. "The Yellow Wall-Paper" and Other Stories. Ed. Robert Shulman. Oxford: Oxford UP, 1995. 218–226.
"A Partnership." Forerunner 5:6 (1914): 141–45. "The Yellow Wall-Paper" and Other Stories. Ed. Robert Shulman. Oxford: Oxford UP, 1995. 253–261.
"Begnina Machiavelli. A NOVEL." Forerunner 5 (1914); NY: Such and Such Publishing, 1998.
"Fulfilment." Forerunner 5:3 (1914): 57–61. "The Yellow Wall-Paper" and Other Stories. Ed. Robert Shulman. Oxford: Oxford UP, 1995.
"If I Were a Man." Physical Culture 32 (1914): 31–34. "The Yellow Wall-Paper" and Other Stories. Ed. Robert Shulman. Oxford: Oxford UP, 1995. 262–268.
"Mr. Peebles's Heart." Forerunner 5:9 (1914): 225–29. "The Yellow Wall-Paper" and Other Stories. Ed. Robert Shulman. Oxford: Oxford UP, 1995. 269–276.
"Dr. Clair's Place." Forerunner 6:6 (1915): 141–45. "The Yellow Wall-Paper" and Other Stories. Ed. Robert Shulman. Oxford: Oxford UP, 1995. 295–303.
"Girls and Land." Forerunner 6:5 (1915): 113–117. "The Yellow Wall-Paper" and Other Stories. Ed. Robert Shulman. Oxford: Oxford UP, 1995. 286–294.
"Herland. A NOVEL. " Forerunner 6 (1915); NY: Pantheon Books, 1979.
"Mrs. Merrill's Duties." Forerunner 6:3 (1915): 57–61. "The Yellow Wall-Paper" and Other Stories. Ed. Robert Shulman. Oxford: Oxford UP, 1995. 277–285.
"A Surplus Woman." Forerunner 7:5 (1916): 113–18. "The Yellow Wall-Paper" and Other Stories. Ed. Robert Shulman. Oxford: Oxford UP, 1995. 304–313.
"Joan's Defender." Forerunner 7:6 (1916): 141–45. '"The Yellow Wall-Paper" and Other Stories. Ed. Robert Shulman. Oxford: Oxford UP, 1995. 314–322.
"The Girl in the Pink Hat." Forerunner 7 (1916): 39–46. The Charlotte Perkins Gilman Reader. Ed. Ann J. Lane. NY: Pantheon, 1980. 39–45.
"With Her in Ourland: Sequel to Herland. A NOVEL." Forerunner 7 (1916); Westport: Greenwood Publishing Group, 1997.

Novels and novellasWhat Diantha Did. Forerunner. 1909–10.
The Crux. Forerunner. 1911.Moving the Mountain. Forerunner. 1911.Mag-Marjorie. Forerunner. 1912.Won Over Forerunner. 1913.Benigna Machiavelli Forerunner. 1914.Herland. Forerunner. 1915.With Her in Ourland. Forerunner. 1916.Unpunished. Ed. Catherine J. Golden and Denise D. Knight. New York: Feminist Press, 1997.

Drama/dialogues

The majority of Gilman's dramas are inaccessible as they are only available from the originals. Some were printed/reprinted in Forerunner, however.

"Dame Nature Interviewed on the Woman Question as It Looks to Her" Kate Field's Washington (1890): 138–40.
"The Twilight." Impress (November 10, 1894): 4–5.
"Story Studies", Impress, November 17, 1894: 5.
"The Story Guessers", Impress, November 24, 1894: 5.
"Three Women." Forerunner 2 (1911): 134.
"Something to Vote For", Forerunner 2 (1911) 143-53.
"The Ceaseless Struggle of Sex: A Dramatic View." Kate Field's Washington. April 9, 1890, 239–40.

Non-fictionWomen and Economics: A Study of the Economic Relation Between Men and Women as a Factor in Social Evolution. Boston: Small, Maynard & Co., 1898.

Book-lengthHis Religion and Hers: A Study of the Faith of Our Fathers and the Work of Our Mothers. NY and London: Century Co., 1923; London: T. Fisher Unwin, 1924; Westport: Hyperion Press, 1976.Gems of Art for the Home and Fireside. Providence: J. A. and R. A. Reid, 1888.Concerning Children. Boston: Small, Maynard & Co., 1900.The Home: Its Work and Influence. New York: McClure, Phillips, & Co., 1903.Human Work. New York: McClure, Phillips, & Co., 1904.The Man-Made World; or, Our Androcentric Culture. New York: Charton Co., 1911.Our Brains and What Ails Them. Serialized in Forerunner. 1912.Social Ethics. Serialized in Forerunner. 1914.Our Changing Morality. Ed. Freda Kirchway. NY: Boni, 1930. 53–66.

Short and serial non-fiction

"On Advertising for Marriage." The Alpha 11, September 1, 1885: 7
"Why Women Do Not Reform Their Dress." Woman's Journal, October 9, 1886: 338.
"A Protest Against Petticoats." Woman's Journal, January 8, 1887: 60.
"The Providence Ladies Gymnasium." Providence Journal 8 (1888): 2.
"How Much Must We Read?" Pacific Monthly 1 (1889): 43–44.
"Altering Human Nature." California Nationalist, May 10, 1890: 10.
"Are Women Better Than Men?" Pacific Monthly 3 (1891): 9–11.
"A Lady on the Cap and Apron Question." Wasp, June 6, 1891: 3.
"The Reactive Lies of Gallantry." Belford's ns 2 (1892): 205–8.
"The Vegetable Chinaman." Housekeeper's Weekly, June 24, 1893: 3.
"The Saloon and Its Annex." Stockton Mail 4 (1893): 4.
"The Business League for Women." Impress 1 (1894): 2.
"Official Report of Woman's Congress." Impress 1 (1894): 3.
"John Smith and Armenia." Impress, January 12, 1895: 2–3.
"The American Government." Woman's Column, June 6, 1896: 3.
"When Socialism Began." American Fabian 3 (1897): 1–2.
"Causes and Uses of the Subjection of Women." Woman's Journal, December 24, 1898: 410.
"The Automobile as a Reformer." Saturday Evening Post, June 3, 1899: 778.
"Superfluous Women." Women's Journal, April 7, 1900: 105.
"Esthetic Dyspepsia." Saturday Evening Post, August 4, 1900: 12.
"Ideals of Child Culture." Child Stude For Mothers and Teachers. Ed Margaret Sangster. Philadelphia: Booklovers Library, 1901. 93–101.
"Should Wives Work?" Success 5 (1902): 139.
"Fortschritte der Frauen in Amerika." Neues Frauenleben 1:1 (1903): 2–5.
"The Passing of the Home in Great American Cities." Cosmopolitan 38 (1904): 137–47.
"The Beauty of a Block." Independent, July 14, 1904: 67–72.
"The Home and the Hospital." Good Housekeeping 40 (1905): 9.
"Some Light on the [Single Woman's] 'Problem.'" American Magazine 62 (1906): 4270428.
"Why Cooperative Housekeeping Fails." Harper's Bazaar 41 (July 1907): 625-629.
"Social Darwinism." American Journal of Sociology 12 (1907): 713–14.
"A Suggestion on the Negro Problem." American Journal of Sociology 14 (1908): 78–85.
"How Home Conditions React Upon the Family." American Journal of Sociology 14 (1909): 592–605.
"Children's Clothing." Harper's Bazaar 44 (1910): 24.
"On Dogs." Forerunner 2 (1911): 206–9.
"Should Women Use Violence?" Pictorial Review 14 (1912): 11, 78-79.
"How to Lighten the Labor of Women." McCall's 40 (1912): 14–15, 77.
"What 'Love' Really Is." Pictorial Review 14 (1913): 11, 57.
"Gum Chewing in Public." New York Times, May 20, 1914:12:5.
"A Rational Position on Suffrage/At the Request of the New York Times, Mrs. Gilman Presents the Best Arguments Possible in Behalf of Votes for Women." New York Times Magazine, March 7, 1915: 14–15.
"What is Feminism?" Boston Sunday Herald Magazine, September 3, 1916: 7.
"The Housekeeper and the Food Problem." Annals of the American Academy 74 (1917): 123–40.
"Concerning Clothes." Independent, June 22, 1918: 478, 483.
"The Socializing of Education." Public, April 5, 1919: 348–49.
"A Woman's Party." Suffragist 8 (1920): 8–9.
"Making Towns Fit to Live In." Century 102 (1921): 361–366.
"Cross-Examining Santa Claus." Century 105 (1922): 169–174.
"Is America Too Hospitable?" Forum 70 (1923): 1983–89.
"Toward Monogamy." Nation, June 11, 1924: 671–73.
"The Nobler Male." Forum 74 (1925): 19–21.
"American Radicals." New York Jewish Daily Forward 1 (1926): 1.
"Progress through Birth Control." North American Review 224 (1927): 622–29.
"Divorce and Birth Control." Outlook, January 25, 1928: 130–31.
"Feminism and Social Progress." Problems of Civilization. Ed. Baker Brownell. NY: D. Van Nostrand, 1929. 115–42.
"Sex and Race Progress." Sex in Civilization. Eds V. F. Calverton and S. D. Schmalhausen. NY: Macaulay, 1929. 109–23.
"Parasitism and Civilized Vice." Woman's Coming of Age. Ed. S. D. Schmalhausen. NY: Liveright, 1931. 110–26.
"Birth Control, Religion and the Unfit." Nation, January 27, 1932: 108–109.
"The Right to Die." Forum 94 (1935): 297–300.

Self-publicationsThe Forerunner. Seven volumes, 1909–16. Microfiche. NY: Greenwood, 1968.

Selected lectures

There are 90 reports of the lectures that Gilman gave in The United States and Europe.

"Club News." Weekly Nationalist, June 21, 1890: 6. [Re. "On Human Nature."]
"Our Place Today", Los Angeles Woman's Club, January 21, 1891.
"With Women Who Write." San Francisco Examiner, March 1891, 3:3. [Re. "The Coming Woman."]
"Safeguards Suggested for Social Evils." San Francisco Call, April 24, 1892: 12:4.
"The Labor Movement." Alameda County Federation of Trades, 1893. Alameda County, CA Labor Union Meetings. September 2, 1892.
"Announcement." Impress 1 (1894): 2. [Re. Series of "Talks on Social Questions."]
"All the Comforts of a Home." San Francisco Examiner, May 22, 1895: 9. [Re. "Simplicity and Decoration."]
"The Washington Convention." Woman's Journal, February 15, 1896: 49–50. [Re. California.]
"Woman Suffrage League." Boston Advertiser, November 10, 1897: 8:1. [Re. "The Economic Basis of the Woman Question."]
"Bellamy Memorial Meeting." American Fabian 4: (1898): 3.
"An Evening With Kipling." Daily Argus, March 14, 1899: 4:2.
"Scientific Training of Domestic Servants." Women and Industrial Life, Vol. 6 of International Congress of Women of 1899. Ed Countess of Aberdeen. London: T. Unwin Fisher, 1900. 109.
"Society and the Child." Brooklyn Eagle, December 11, 1902: 8:4.
"Woman and Work/ Popular Fallacy that They are a Leisure Class, Says Mrs. Gilman." New York Tribune, February 26, 1903: 7:1.
"A New Light on the Woman Question." Woman's Journal, April 25, 1904: 76–77.
"Straight Talk by Mrs. Gilman is Looked For." San Francisco Call, July 16, 1905: 33:2.
"Women and Social Service." Warren: National American Woman Suffrage Association, 1907.
"Higher Marriage Mrs. Gilman's Plea." New York Times, December 29, 1908: 2:3.
"Three Women Leaders in Hub." Boston Post, December 7, 1909: 1:1–2 and 14:5–6.
"Warless World When Women's Slavery Ends." San Francisco Examiner, November 14, 1910: 4:1.
"Lecture Given by Mrs. Gilman." San Francisco Call, November 15, 1911: 7:3. [Re. "The Society-- Body and Soul."]
"Mrs. Gilman Assorts Sins." New York Times, June 3, 1913: 3:8
"Adam the Real Rib, Mrs. Gilman Insists." New York Times, February 19, 1914: 9:3.
"Advocates a 'World City.'" New York Times, January 6, 1915: 15:5. [Re. Arbitration of diplomatic disputes by an international agency.]
"The Listener." Boston Transcript, April 14, 1917: 14:1. [Re. Announcement of lecture series.]
"Great Duty for Women After War." Boston Post, February 26, 1918: 2:7.
"Mrs. Gilman Urges Hired Mother Idea." New York Times, September 23, 1919: 36:1–2.
"Eulogize Susan B. Anthony." New York Times, February 16, 1920: 15:6. [Re. Gilman and others eulogize Anthony on the centenary of her birth.]
"Walt Whitman Dinner." New York Times, June 1, 1921: 16:7. [Gilman speaks at annual meeting of Whitman Society in New York.]
"Fiction of America Being Melting Pot Unmasked by CPG." Dallas Morning News, February 15, 1926: 9:7–8 and 15:8.

Diaries, journals, biographies, and lettersCharlotte Perkins Gilman: The Making of a Radical Feminist. Mary A. Hill. Philadelphia: Temple University Press, 1980.A Journey from Within: The Love Letters of Charlotte Perkins Gilman, 1897–1900. Ed. Mary A. Hill. Lewisburg: Bucknill UP, 1995.The Diaries of Charlotte Perkins Gilman, 2 Vols. Ed. Denise D. Knight. Charlottesville: University Press of Virginia, 1994.

AutobiographyThe Living of Charlotte Perkins Gilman: An Autobiography. New York and London: D. Appleton-Century Co., 1935; NY: Arno Press, 1972; and Harper & Row, 1975.

Academic studies
Allen, Judith (2009). The Feminism of Charlotte Perkins Gilman: Sexualities, Histories, Progressivism, University of Chicago Press, 
Allen, Polly Wynn (1988). Building Domestic Liberty: Charlotte Perkins Gilman's Architectural Feminism, University of Massachusetts Press, 
Berman, Jeffrey. "The Unrestful Cure: Charlotte Perkins Gilman and 'The Yellow Wallpaper.'" In The Captive Imagination: A Casebook on The Yellow Wallpaper, edited by Catherine Golden. New York: Feminist Press, 1992, pp. 211–41.
Carter-Sanborn, Kristin. "Restraining Order: The Imperialist Anti-Violence of Charlotte Perkins Gilman." Arizona Quarterly 56.2 (Summer 2000): 1–36.
Ceplair, Larry, ed. Charlotte Perkins Gilman: A Nonfiction Reader. New York: Columbia UP, 1991.
Davis, Cynthia J. Charlotte Perkins Gilman: A Biography (Stanford University Press; 2010) 568 pages; major scholarly biography
Davis, Cynthia J. and Denise D. Knight. Charlotte Perkins Gilman and Her Contemporaries: Literary and Intellectual Contexts. Tuscaloosa: University of Alabama Press, 2004.
Deegan, Mary Jo. "Introduction." With Her in Ourland: Sequel to Herland. Eds. Mary Jo Deegan and Michael R. Hill. Westport, CT: Praeger, 1997. 1–57.
Eldredge, Charles C. Charles Walter Stetson, Color, and Fantasy. Lawrence: Spencer Museum of Art, The U of Kansas, 1982.
Ganobcsik-Williams, Lisa. "The Intellectualism of Charlotte Perkins Gilman: Evolutionary Perspectives on Race, Ethnicity, and Gender." Charlotte Perkins Gilman: Optimist Reformer. Eds. Jill Rudd and Val Gough. Iowa City: U of Iowa P, 1999.
Golden, Catherine. The Captive Imagination: A Casebook on The Yellow Wallpaper. New York: Feminist Press, 1992.
---. "`Written to Drive Nails With’: Recalling the Early Poetry of Charlotte Perkins Gilman." in Charlotte Perkins Gilman: Optimist Reformer. Eds. Jill Rudd and Val Gough. Iowa City: U of Iowa P, 1999. 243-66.
Gough, Val. "`In the Twinkling of an Eye’: Gilman's Utopian Imagination." in A Very Different Story: Studies on the Fiction of Charlotte Perkins Gilman. Eds. Val Gough and Jill Rudd. Liverpool: Liverpool UP, 1998. 129–43.
Gubar, Susan. "She in Herland: Feminism as Fantasy." in Charlotte Perkins Gilman: The Woman and Her Work. Ed. Sheryl L. Meyering. Ann Arbor: UMI Research Press, 1989. 191–201.
Hill, Mary Armfield. "Charlotte Perkins Gilman and the Journey From Within." in A Very Different Story: Studies on the Fiction of Charlotte Perkins Gilman. Eds. Val Gough and Jill Rudd. Liverpool: Liverpool UP, 1998. 8–23.
Hill, Mary A. Charlotte Perkins Gilman: The Making of a Radical Feminist. (Temple University Press, 1980).
Horowitz, Helen Lefkowitz, Wild Unrest: Charlotte Perkins Gilman and the Making of "The Yellow Wall-Paper" (New York: Oxford University Press, 2010).
Huber, Hannah, "Charlotte Perkins Gilman." Dictionary of Literary Biography, Volume 381: Writers on Women's Rights and United States Suffrage, edited by George P. Anderson. Gale, pp. 140–52.
Huber, Hannah, "‘The One End to Which Her Whole Organism Tended’: Social Evolution in Edith Wharton and Charlotte Perkins Gilman." Critical Insights: Edith Wharton, edited by Myrto Drizou, Salem Press, pp. 48–62.
Karpinski, Joanne B., "The Economic Conundrum in the Lifewriting of Charlotte Perkins Gilman. in The Mixed Legacy of Charlotte Perkins Gilman. Ed. Catherine J. Golden and Joanne S. Zangrando. U of Delaware P, 2000. 35–46.
Kessler, Carol Farley. "Dreaming Always of Lovely Things Beyond’: Living Toward Herland, Experiential foregrounding." in The Mixed Legacy of Charlotte Perkins Gilman, Eds. Catherine J. Golden and Joanna Schneider Zangrando. Newark: U of Delaware P, 2000. 89–103.
Knight, Denise D. Charlotte Perkins Gilman: A Study of the Short Fiction, Twayne Studies in Short Fiction (Twayne Publishers, 1997).
---. "Charlotte Perkins Gilman and the Shadow of Racism." American Literary Realism, vol. 32, no. 2, 2000, pp. 159–169. JSTOR, www.jstor.org/stable/27746975.
---. "Introduction." Herland, `The Yellow Wall-Paper’ and Selected Writings. New York: Penguin, 1999.
Lane, Ann J. "Gilman, Charlotte Perkins"; American National Biography Online, 2000.
---. "The Fictional World of Charlotte Perkins Gilman." in The Charlotte Perkins Gilman Reader. Ed. Ann J. Lane. New York: Pantheon, 1980.
---. "Introduction." Herland: A Lost Feminist Utopian Novel by Charlotte Perkins Gilman. 1915. Rpt. New York: Pantheon Books, 1979
---. To Herland and Beyond: The Life of Charlotte Perkins Gilman. New York: Pantheon, 1990.
Lanser, Susan S. "Feminist Criticism, 'The Yellow Wallpaper,' and the Politics of Color in America." Feminist Studies, Vol. 15, No. 3, Feminist Reinterpretations/Reinterpretations of Feminism (Autumn, 1989), pp. 415–441. JSTOR, Reprinted in "The Yellow Wallpaper": Charlotte Perkins Gilman. Eds. Thomas L. Erskine and Connie L. Richards. New Brunswick: Rutgers UP, 1993. 225–256.
Long, Lisa A. "Herland and the Gender of Science." in MLA Approaches to Teaching Gilman's The Yellow Wall-Paper and Herland. Eds. Denise D. Knight and Cynthia J. David. New York: Modern Language Association of America, 2003. 125–132.
Mitchell, S. Weir, M.D. "Camp Cure." Nurse and Patient, and Camp Cure. Philadelphia: Lippincott, 1877
---. Wear and Tear, or Hints for the Overworked. 1887. New York: Arno Press, 1973.
Oliver, Lawrence J. "W. E. B. Du Bois, Charlotte Perkins Gilman, and ‘A Suggestion on the Negro Problem.’" American Literary Realism, vol. 48, no. 1, 2015, pp. 25–39. JSTOR, www.jstor.org/stable/10.5406/amerlitereal.48.1.0025.
Oliver, Lawrence J. and Gary Scharnhorst. "Charlotte Perkins Gilman v. Ambrose Bierce: The Literary Politics of Gender in Fin-de-Siècle California." Journal of the West (July 1993): 52–60.
Palmeri, Ann. "Charlotte Perkins Gilman: Forerunner of a Feminist Social Science." in Discovering Reality: Feminist Perspectives on Epistemology, Metaphysics, Methodology and Philosophy of Science. Eds. Sandra Harding and Merrill B. Hintikka. Dordrecht: Reidel, 1983. 97–120.
Scharnhorst, Gary. Charlotte Perkins Gilman. Boston: Twayne, 1985. Studies Gilman as writer
Scharnhorst, Gary, and Denise D. Knight. "Charlotte Perkins Gilman's Library: A Reconstruction." Resources for American Literary Studies 23:2 (1997): 181–219.
Stetson, Charles Walter. Endure: The Diaries of Charles Walter Stetson. Ed. Mary A. Hill. Philadelphia: Temple UP, 1985.
Tuttle, Jennifer S. "Rewriting the West Cure: Charlotte Perkins Gilman, Owen Wister, and the Sexual Politics of Neurasthenia." The Mixed Legacy of Charlotte Perkins Gilman. Eds. Catherine J. Golden and Joanna Schneider Zangrando. Newark: U of Delaware P, 2000. 103–121.
Von Rosk, Nancy. "Women, Work and Cross-Class Alliances in the Fiction of Charlotte Perkins Gilman." Working Women in American Literature, 1865-1950. Miriam Gogol ed.  New York: Rowman and Littlefield, 2018. 69-91.
Wegener, Frederick. "What a Comfort a Woman Doctor Is!’ Medical Women in the Life and Writing of Charlotte Perkins Gilman. In Charlotte Perkins Gilman: Optimist Reformer. Eds. Jill Rudd & Val Gough. Iowa City: U of Iowa P, 1999. 45–73.
Weinbaum, Alys Eve. "Writing Feminist Genealogy: Charlotte Perkins Gilman, Racial Nationalism, and the Reproduction of Maternalist Feminism." Feminist Studies'' 27 (Summer 2001): 271–30.

Footnotes

External links

 Charlotte Perkins Gilman Society
 
 
 
 
 
 
 The Feminist Press
 Essays by Charlotte Perkins Gilman at Quotidiana.org
 "A Guide for Research Materials"
 "Charlotte Perkins Gilman: Domestic Goddess"
 
 Suffrage Songs and Verses
Charlotte Perkins Gilman Papers. Schlesinger Library, Radcliffe Institute, Harvard University.
Charlotte Perkins Gilman Digital Collection. Schlesinger Library, Radcliffe Institute, Harvard University.
 Charlotte Perkins Gilman Papers, Rare Books, Special Collections, and Preservation, River Campus Libraries, University of Rochester

Audio files
 The Yellow Wallpaper, Suspense, CBS radio, 1948
 2 short radio episodes of Gilman's writing, "California Colors" and "Matriatism" from California Legacy Project.

1860 births
1935 deaths
1935 suicides
20th-century American novelists
American women novelists
American women poets
American feminist writers
American socialists
LGBT feminists
American LGBT writers
Writers from Hartford, Connecticut
Women science fiction and fantasy writers
American science fiction writers
Beecher family
Drug-related suicides in California
American women sociologists
American sociologists
Philosophers from Connecticut
19th-century American philosophers
20th-century American philosophers
Utopian socialists
American suffragists
American women short story writers
20th-century American women writers
19th-century American women writers
20th-century American poets
19th-century American short story writers
20th-century American short story writers
Novelists from Connecticut
American women non-fiction writers
Writers of Gothic fiction
American socialist feminists
Pacific Coast Women's Press Association
American eugenicists